Treat Huey and Nathaniel Lammons were the defending champions but only Huey chose to defend his title, partnering Sem Verbeek. Huey lost in the quarterfinals to Emilio Gómez and Roberto Quiroz.

Robert Galloway and Alex Lawson won the title after defeating Evan King and Hunter Reese 7–5, 6–7(5–7), [11–9] in the final.

Seeds

Draw

References

External links
 Main draw

Cleveland Open - Doubles
Cleveland Open